Sydney Mellor (1893 – 1965) was an English footballer who played in the Football League for Stoke.

Career
Mellor was born in Leek and played for the local club Leek Town before joining Stoke in 1920. He played 11 times for Stoke scoring once which came in a 4–2 win away at Derby County on 25 February 1922.

Career statistics
Source:

References

1893 births
1965 deaths
Sportspeople from Leek, Staffordshire
English footballers
Macclesfield Town F.C. players
Stoke City F.C. players
Congleton Town F.C. players
English Football League players
Association football inside forwards